Streets of San Francisco is a 1949 American crime film directed by George Blair, written by John K. Butler and starring Robert Armstrong, Mae Clarke, Gary Gray, Wally Cassell, Richard Benedict and John Harmon. It was released on April 15, 1949 by Republic Pictures.

Plot

Frankie Fraser finds out his father Luke has committed a theft netting $250,000. The boy is forced to go along with Fraser and his three accomplices, missing school. Lt. Will Logan of the police puts the pieces together and investigates.

In a confrontation, Will kills Fraser, but then is unable to get young Frankie to tell what he knows. The now homeless child is permitted to stay 10 days at the lieutenant's home, meeting Will's kind wife Hazel and father-in-law Pop, and comes to appreciate their kindness toward him. Will is eventually willing to adopt him.

A prying reporter, Nichols, causes trouble for Will, making it appear he's only sheltering the kid to make him inform. Fraser's partners in crime come to snatch the boy, shooting and wounding Pop in the process. At the train station where the stolen loot is stashed, Frankie manages to tip off a clerk to call the police. The gang is overcome with tear gas, after which Will takes the boy safely home.

Cast    
Robert Armstrong as Willard Logan
Mae Clarke as Hazel Logan
Gary Gray as Frankie Fraser
Wally Cassell as Den Driscoll
Richard Benedict as Henry Walker
John Harmon as Sammy Hess
J. Farrell MacDonald as Pop Lockhart
Ian MacDonald as Luke Fraser
Charles Meredith as Eckert
Eve March as Joyce Quinn
Denver Pyle as Ed Quinn
Charles Cane as John O'Halloran
William "Bill" Henry as Nichols 
Claire Du Brey as Mrs. Partridge
Martin Garralaga as Rocco
Ross Elliott as Clevens

References

External links 
 

1949 films
American crime films
1949 crime films
Republic Pictures films
Films directed by George Blair
Films set in San Francisco
American black-and-white films
1940s English-language films
1940s American films